The George Widrick House is a historic home located at Frederick, Frederick County, Maryland, United States. It is a -story Federal period brick dwelling, with a 2-story service wing.  Outbuildings include a small brick smokehouse and the stone foundation of a barn.

The George Widrick House was listed on the National Register of Historic Places in 1985.

References

External links
, including photo in 1984, at Maryland Historical Trust

Federal architecture in Maryland
Houses in Frederick County, Maryland
Houses on the National Register of Historic Places in Maryland
National Register of Historic Places in Frederick County, Maryland